Gelatinases are enzymes capable of degrading gelatin.

Gelatinases are expressed in several bacteria including Pseudomonas aeruginosa and Serratia marcescens.

In humans, the gelatinases are matrix metalloproteinases MMP2 and MMP9.

References

EC 3.4.24